Blera himalaya is a species of hoverfly in the family Syrphidae.

Distribution
India.

References

Eristalinae
Insects described in 2000
Diptera of Asia
Taxa named by F. Christian Thompson